Gladwin County is a county located in the U.S. state of Michigan. As of the 2020 Census, the population was 25,386. The county seat is Gladwin.

History

Prehistory
Gladwin County is a headwaters area. Most of the water that flows out of the county via the Tittabawassee River comes from Gladwin County, only a very small portion flows in from Clare or Roscommon counties. Native Americans crossed this area, and even spent summers here where the fishing was good and summer berries plentiful.

Research is underway to determine the importance of an ancient trail that was noted by the crew of the 1839 re-survey of Township 17 north Range 2 west, which later became Beaverton Township. The eastern terminus of the "Muskegon River Trail" was plotted at the confluence of the three branches of the Tobacco (Assa-mo-quoi-Sepe) River in the northwest corner of Section 12. It is possible that an early cross-country route from Saginaw Bay to Lake Michigan proceeded up the Saginaw, Tittabawassee, and Tobacco Rivers to a point west across Ross Lake from the Beaverton City Cemetery. At that point, the canoes would be portaged along the trail to the Muskegon River, then floated down to Lake Michigan.

Many native artifacts have been found along that route that attest to seasonal occupation, but so far no signs have been found to indicate a permanent settlement.

European arrival
The earliest documented visitors to the area were surveyors who platted the lands under provision of the 1787 Northwest Ordinance. Most of the early work was completed during the 1830s, although some of the survey work was faulty - the surveyors reportedly doubted that the area would ever be settled.

The earliest census to mention residents in the area was in 1860.

The county is named for Henry Gladwin, British military commandant at Detroit in 1763 during Pontiac's War. The county was set off and named in 1831, and its government was organized in 1875.

Sesquicentennial
The year 2011 marked 150 years since the first permanent settler of record, Marvel Secord, took up residence along the Tittabawassee River in what is now Secord Township.  He was a trapper and trader who provided supplies to lumbering camps in the area. Another man, William Brayton, may have been an earlier settler; the 1860 census listed 14 residents, including two families with children. Of these, 11 were associated with lumbering camps that had begun to appear that year, and three were listed as "hunters." One of the "day laborers" at a camp had brought his wife to the area. The first issue of the Gladwin County Record (1878) mentions his 20 acres (8 Ha) of wheat under cultivation. His stepson, Dr. Russell E. Finch arrived in the area in 1875, becoming the county's first physician. William Brayton died in 1895. His claim to being the first permanent settler appears valid, except that just before the 1880 census was taken he and his wife went to Lynn, Massachusetts to care for his dying father. He returned to Gladwin after settling his father's estate in 1882, thus missing being included in the Gladwin County census for 1880.

Geography
It is the second-smallest county in Michigan by total area. Gladwin County is sometimes considered to be a part of Central Michigan, and at other times is included in Northern Michigan.

Major highways
  runs north–south through the western part of the county. It runs south along the western county line from the county's northwestern corner for  then runs east and south to Gladwin, then west and south to Beaverton. It exits the county  from the southwestern county corner, running to an intersection with US 10.
It runs westerly through the northern part of county, then turns to run south through the center part of county. The highway passes White Star and Billings before exiting the south county line near its midpoint.
  runs east–west through center part of county and passes Gladwin and White Star.

County designated highways

Adjacent counties

 Ogemaw County – northeast
 Arenac County – east
 Bay County – southeast
 Midland County – south
 Clare County – west
 Isabella County – southwest
 Roscommon County – northwest

Demographics

As of the 2000 United States Census, of 2000, there were 26,023 people, 10,561 households, and 7,614 families in the county. The population density was 51 people per square mile (20/km2). There were 16,828 housing units at an average density of 33 per square mile (13/km2). The racial makeup of the county was 97.65% White, 0.13% Black or African American, 0.56% Native American, 0.27% Asian, 0.02% Pacific Islander, 0.31% from other races, and 1.06% from two or more races. 0.96% of the population were Hispanic or Latino of any race. 28.1% were of German, 11.5% American, 11.1% English, 9.4% Irish, 7.3% Polish and 6.4% French ancestry according to Census 2000. 96.3% spoke English, 1.7% German and 1.1% Spanish as their first language.

There were 10,561 households, out of which 27.10% had children under the age of 18 living with them, 60.50% were married couples living together, 8.00% had a female householder with no husband present, and 27.90% were non-families. 24.00% of all households were made up of individuals, and 11.20% had someone living alone who was 65 years of age or older. The average household size was 2.43 and the average family size was 2.85.

The county population contained 23.20% under the age of 18, 6.50% from 18 to 24, 24.20% from 25 to 44, 27.80% from 45 to 64, and 18.30% who were 65 years of age or older. The median age was 42 years. For every 100 females there were 98.50 males. For every 100 females age 18 and over, there were 95.30 males.

The median income for a household in the county was $32,019, and the median income for a family was $37,090. Males had a median income of $33,871 versus $21,956 for females. The per capita income for the county was $16,614. About 10.40% of families and 13.80% of the population were below the poverty line, including 19.40% of those under age 18 and 7.30% of those age 65 or over.

Government
Gladwin County has been reliably Republican from the beginning. Since 1884, the Republican Party nominee has carried the county vote in 85% of the elections (29 of 35 elections).

The county government operates the jail, maintains rural roads, operates the major local courts, records deeds, mortgages, and vital records, administers public health regulations, and participates with the state in the provision of social services. The county
board of commissioners controls the budget and has limited authority to make laws or ordinances. In Michigan, most local government functions — police and fire, building and zoning, tax assessment, street maintenance, etc. — are the responsibility of individual cities and townships.

Elected officials

 Prosecuting Attorney: Norm Gage
 Sheriff: Michael Shea
 County Clerk: Karrie Hulme
 County Treasurer: Christy VanTiem
 Register of Deeds: Ann Manning-Clayton
 Drain Commissioner: Terry Walters
 Road Commissioners: Chuck Hinman
 County Administrator: Mark Justin
 Commissioner Dist. 1 – Kyle Grove
 Commissioner Dist. 2 – Ron Taylor
 Commissioner Dist. 3 – Michael Szuch
 Commissioner Dist. 4 – Karen Moore
 Commissioner Dist. 5 – Rick Grovel

(information as of 2021)

Communities

Cities
 Beaverton
 Gladwin (county seat)

Civil townships

 Beaverton Township
 Bentley Township
 Billings Township
 Bourret Township
 Buckeye Township
 Butman Township
 Clement Township
 Gladwin Township
 Grim Township
 Grout Township
 Hay Township
 Sage Township
 Secord Township
 Sherman Township
 Tobacco Township

Unincorporated communities

 Albright Shores
 Billings
 Butman
 Dale
 Estey
 Hockaday
 Lockwood Beach
 Rhodes
 Secord
 Skeels
 Sugar Rapids
 White Star
 Wildwood Shores
 Winegars
 Wooden Shoe Village

Ghost town
 Hard Luck

See also
 List of Michigan State Historic Sites in Gladwin County, Michigan
 National Register of Historic Places listings in Gladwin County, Michigan

References

External links
 Gladwin County government
 Gladwin City government
 Beaverton City government
 Gladwin County Chamber of Commerce
 Gladwin County Economic Development Corp.
 Gladwinmi.com (hosted by the Gladwin County Record)
 
 Gladwin County Historical Society
 Gladwin County District Library
 Gladwin Community Schools
 Beaverton Rural Schools

 
Michigan counties
1875 establishments in Michigan
Populated places established in 1875